Franz Hanreiter (4 November 1913 – 21 January 1992) was an Austrian international footballer.

References

1913 births
1992 deaths
Association football midfielders
Austrian footballers
German footballers
Austria international footballers
Germany international footballers
Dual internationalists (football)
Ligue 1 players